University of Oklahoma Observatory (IAU code H30) is an astronomical observatory. It is located in Norman, Oklahoma on the campus of the University of Oklahoma.
Built in 1939, with a 10-inch Newtonian reflector and a smaller 3.5-inch telescope, it was housed in a 16-foot dome atop what was at the time the southernmost building on campus. In 1995, the original 10-inch telescope was replaced by a  Meade SCT.

See also 
 List of observatories
  
Article from Sooner Magazine announcing the observatory's construction

References

External links
 Oklahoma City Clear sky clock Weather forecasts of observing conditions.

Astronomical observatories in Oklahoma
University of Oklahoma campus